The  was an infantry division in the Imperial Japanese Army. The 22nd Division was raised in 1938 out of the reserve components of the 14th Division, on the same day as 15th, 17th, 21st and 23rd divisions, as part of the military buildup following the outbreak of the Second Sino-Japanese War.

Action
After minimal training, it was assigned to the Japanese Central China Area Army, and participated at the Battle of Wuhan. Assigned to the Japanese 13th Army, its primary duty was initially to be a garrison force for the Hangzhou area. However, as the war against China continued to heat up, the 22nd Division was called upon in the Third War Area in the 1939-40 Winter Offensive campaign. In 1942, it fought in Quzhou, Guangfeng District and other places. By 1943, the 22nd division was garrisoning Jinhua. 24 November 1943, the divisional infantry brigade was abolished and infantry regiments were directly subordinated to the divisional command. By February 1944 the 22nd Division came under the command of the Japanese 23rd Army, and was in Guangdong province, opposite Hong Kong. An effort to cross over into Hong Kong was thwarted by the US Navy, which resulted in the loss of most of the 86th Infantry Regiment when their transports were sunk. Unable to reach Hong Kong, the 22nd Division turned south, and fought its way through Guangxi province (and participating in the Battle of Guilin-Liuzhou (a part of a general Japanese offensive operation Ichi-Go), until it linked with the Japanese-occupied French Indochina. In 1945, the headquarters of the 22nd Division was in Bangkok, Thailand, and it contributed forces to the defense of Burma against the British (Operation Dracula). The 22nd Division was dissolved in Bangkok with the dissolution of the Imperial Japanese Army at the end of World War II; however, a number of its troops refused to return to Japan, and defected to join the Viet Minh in their struggle for independence (First Indochina War) against the returning French colonial forces.

See also
 List of Japanese Infantry Divisions

Reference and further reading

 Madej, W. Victor. Japanese Armed Forces Order of Battle, 1937-1945 [2 vols] Allentown, PA: 1981
 This article incorporates material from the Japanese Wikipedia page 第22師団 (日本軍), accessed 7 March 2016

Japanese World War II divisions
Infantry divisions of Japan
Military units and formations established in 1938
Military units and formations disestablished in 1945
1938 establishments in Japan
1945 disestablishments in Japan